Francisco Javier Oliveras Noa (born January 31, 1963) is a retired Major League Baseball pitcher.

See also
 List of Major League Baseball players from Puerto Rico

External links

1963 births
Living people
Major League Baseball pitchers
Major League Baseball players from Puerto Rico
Daytona Beach Admirals players
Minnesota Twins players
San Francisco Giants players
San Jose Giants players
Portland Beavers players
Orlando Twins players
Phoenix Firebirds players
Oklahoma City 89ers players
Nashua Pride players
Rochester Red Wings players
Charlotte O's players
Miami Orioles players
Beaumont Golden Gators players
Brother Elephants players
Diablos Rojos del México players
Puerto Rican expatriate baseball players in Mexico
Leones de Yucatán players
Rojos del Águila de Veracruz players
Puerto Rican expatriate baseball players in Italy
Nettuno Baseball Club players